Dylan Kerr (born 14 January 1967) is a Maltese-born English football manager and former professional footballer who played as a left back. He is currently acting head coach for South African Premier Division club Marumo Gallants.

Playing career
Kerr began his playing career with Sheffield Wednesday. 

After gaining playing experience in South Africa with Arcadia Shepherds, he returned to the UK and joined Leeds United in 1989. 

He made a number of appearances in the Leeds United first team as they won the Division 2 and Division 1 titles, but was unable to hold down a regular starting place.

Kerr joined Reading in the summer of 1993 and won the player of the season award in his first season, as Reading won the Division 2 title. 

He was part of the Reading side that finished second in Division 1 the following season but missed out on automatic promotion to the Premier League, as the division was being restructured. 

Reading reached the 1995 Division 1 play-off final, but Kerr was not included in the match day squad. Reading lost 4-3 after extra-time against Bolton Wanderers.

Kerr left Reading in 1996 to join Kilmarnock and won the 1996-97 Scottish Cup with them.

After a spell with Slough Town, he signed for Hamilton Academical in January 2001 and won the SFL Division 3 title. 

Then, after a brief spell with Exeter City, he returned to Scotland and spent the 2001–02 season at Greenock Morton.

He had spells with Harrogate Town and Gateshead before returning to Hamilton Academical in 2003. He finished his playing career with Kilwinning Rangers.

Coaching career
Kerr has won multiple league titles and cup competitions as a head coach in Africa and Asia and has helped a number of South African Premier Division clubs avoid relegation.

Introduction to coaching
After retiring as a player, Kerr coached in Phoenix, Arizona, then returned to Scotland and worked as Argyll and Bute Council's Football Development Officer between 2005 and 2009. Kerr also worked for the Football Associations of England, Scotland and Northern Ireland and qualified for various UEFA badges.

Coaching roles in South Africa and Vietnam
In September 2009, Kerr joined South African club Mpumalanga Black Aces as assistant manager, working with head coach Sammy Troughton.

In 2011, he was appointed as academy director and assistant coach at Khatoco in V.League 1, the top division in Vietnam. Kerr followed the franchise when it was sold to Hải Phòng. He assisted the head coach and was head of development for the younger players. 

In 2012 Kerr was involved with the Vietnamese national team for the AFF Championship, assisting the technical bench and heading the fitness programme.

Hải Phòng
In 2013 Kerr became head coach of Hải Phòng, leading them to success in the Vietnam National Cup in his first season. 

Kerr decided not to renew his contract at the end of the season and left the club.

Burton Albion, Simba and return to UK
In 2015, Kerr was Burton Albion Academy’s Under-18s head coach, before joining Tanzanian Premier League club Simba as head coach. He guided the team into the top three in the league. In 2016, he returned to the UK and was appointed as the Under-18s academy coach at Chesterfield.

Gor Mahia
In July 2017, Kerr was confirmed as head coach of Gor Mahia. He won the Kenyan Premier League manager of the month award in September 2017 on his way to winning the league title in his first season. He won the Kenyan Premier League coach of the month award again in June 2018.

Kerr completed a trophy treble in 2018, winning the Kenyan Premier League, Kenyan Super Cup and SportPesa Super Cup, as well as securing qualification for the 2018 CAF Confederation Cup group stages. He resigned in November 2018.

Black Leopards
In November 2018, Kerr was appointed as manager of Black Leopards in the South African Premier Division. 

He won the coach of the month award in January 2019, becoming the first Leopards coach in 10 years to win the accolade, and helped Leopards avoid relegation. He resigned in May 2019.

Baroka
In January 2020, Kerr was appointed as the head coach of Baroka, but missed some of his early matches due to a work permit delay. 

Kerr kept Baroka in the South African Premier Division, but Baroka suspended him in November 2020 for what the club described as 'undermining the chairman and owner in a post-match press conference'. With three years remaining on his contract, Kerr decided to take legal action for unfair dismissal and won his case.

Black Leopards return and cup success with TTM
He returned to Black Leopards in November 2020, then was appointed head coach at Tshakhuma Tsha Madzivhandila in February 2021 and won the Nedbank Cup during his time in charge. 

He left the club at the end of the 2020-21 season.

Moroka Swallows and Warriors cup success
In November 2021, Kerr was appointed as the head coach of Moroka Swallows with Swallows in the South African Premier Division relegation zone. 

He guided Swallows to safety via the play-offs, but his contract was not renewed and he left the club in September 2022.

During his time as Swallows manager, Kerr was appointed as manager of the Warriors side for the DStv Compact Cup, a mid-season competition featuring players from PSL teams representing different regions in South Africa. Warriors lifted the trophy after a win against Coastal United at the FNB Stadium in Johannesburg on 29 January 2022.

Marumo Gallants
In January 2023, Kerr was appointed as acting head coach for South African Premier Division club Marumo Gallants with the club at the bottom of the division. 

He was named as technical consultant, but revealed that he is acting as head coach while waiting for his work permit to be approved.

Gallants won their first four games after Kerr's appointment. 

A 2-0 victory against South African Premier Division rivals Sekhukhune United was followed by a 3-1 win in the Nedbank Cup against Magesi. 

Kerr's side then won two games in the CAF Confederation Cup - a 4-1 victory against Libyan side Al Akhdar and a 2-1 win against Congolese side Saint-Eloi Lupopo.

Personal life
Kerr was born in Valletta, Malta, but grew up in Mexborough, England.
 
He was exposed to voodoo practices as part of an initiation ceremony when he joined South African club Arcadia Shepherds in 1988 as a 21-year-old. He revealed that he stood in a bath, naked apart from his football boots, as the heads were cut off three live chickens and their blood was poured on him.

Kerr says he is lucky to be alive after he was involved in a car accident during his time as a player at Reading F.C. He was driving and had a passenger in the car. Recalling the incident during a Q&A conversation with Reading fans on the "1871" podcast in June 2022, he said: "A car came up and I lost control and I hit the car. Luckily I didn't hit it head on - if I'd hit it head on we'd have both been dead."

Kerr was married in 1995 at the age of 28, but the marriage ended within a year.

On 26 December 2022, he was robbed at gunpoint in Durban, South Africa.

Media work

Kerr was a pundit for South African broadcaster SuperSports' Euro 2020 coverage in 2021. 

Since February 2022, Kerr has been co-host of the "1871" podcast, a podcast for Reading F.C. fans.

Honours and achievements
As a player

Sheffield Wednesday
 1983–84: Promotion to EFL Division 1
Arcadia Shepherds
 1986–87: BP Cup winners
Leeds United
 1989–90: EFL Division 2 winners
 1991–92: EFL Division 1 winners
Blackpool
 1991–92: Promotion to EFL Division 2
Reading
 1993–94: EFL Division 2 winners
 1994–95: EFL Division 1 runners-up
Kilmarnock
 1996–97: Scottish Cup winners
Hamilton Academical
 2000–01: SFL Division 3 winners

As a manager

Hải Phòng
 2013–14: Vietnam National Cup winners
Gor Mahia
 2017: Kenyan Premier League winners
 2018: Kenyan Premier League winners
 2018: Kenyan Super Cup winners
 2018: SportPesa Super Cup winners
 2018: Qualification for CAF Confederation Cup group stage
Tshakhuma Tsha Madzivhandila
 2020–21: Nedbank Cup winners
Warriors
 2022: DStv Compact Cup winners

Individual

 PFA Team of the Year: 1993–94 Second Division
 Reading FC player of the season 1993–94
 Reading FC Hall of Fame inductee
 Kenyan Premier League coach of the month - September 2017
 Kenyan Premier League coach of the month - June 2018
 South African Premier Division manager of the month - January 2019

References

External links

Kerr's profile at FootballCentral.org
Do you remember? Dylan Kerr 1996–2000 – KillieFC.com

1967 births
Living people
English footballers
Maltese footballers
Sheffield Wednesday F.C. players
Leeds United F.C. players
Doncaster Rovers F.C. players
Blackpool F.C. players
English expatriates in South Africa
Reading F.C. players
Carlisle United F.C. players
Slough Town F.C. players
Kidderminster Harriers F.C. players
Kilmarnock F.C. players
Hamilton Academical F.C. players
Exeter City F.C. players
Greenock Morton F.C. players
Gateshead F.C. players
Harrogate Town A.F.C. players
Premier League players
Kilwinning Rangers F.C. players
Expatriate soccer players in South Africa
Scottish Football League players
English Football League players
People from Valletta
Scottish Premier League players
Northern Premier League players
Expatriate football managers in Vietnam
East Stirlingshire F.C. players
Arcadia Shepherds F.C. players
Chesterfield F.C. non-playing staff
Association football fullbacks
Expatriate footballers in B
Black Leopards F.C. managers
Baroka F.C. managers
English football managers
Haiphong FC managers